The Conjuring: The Devil Made Me Do It (also known as The Conjuring 3) is a 2021 American supernatural horror film directed by Michael Chaves, with a screenplay by David Leslie Johnson-McGoldrick from a story by Johnson-McGoldrick and James Wan. The film serves as a sequel to The Conjuring (2013) and The Conjuring 2 (2016), and as the eighth installment in The Conjuring Universe. Patrick Wilson and Vera Farmiga reprise their roles as paranormal investigators and authors Ed and Lorraine Warren, with Ruairi O'Connor, Sarah Catherine Hook, and Julian Hilliard also starring. Wan and Peter Safran return to produce the film, which is based on the trial of Arne Cheyenne Johnson, a murder trial that took place in 1981 Connecticut, in addition to The Devil in Connecticut, a book about the trial written by Gerald Brittle.

Initial development for a third Conjuring film began in 2016, though Wan stated that he would not be directing another film in the series due to scheduling conflicts with other projects. Safran confirmed that the next film would not be a haunted house film. By June 2017, it was officially announced that a third installment was in development, with David Leslie Johnson hired to write the screenplay. Michael Chaves was announced as the film's director, after previously directing The Curse of La Llorona (2019). Filming took place in Georgia in summer 2019.

Originally slated for a September 2020 release, the film was delayed due to the COVID-19 pandemic. The Conjuring: The Devil Made Me Do It was released by Warner Bros. Pictures and New Line Cinema in the United States on June 4, 2021, where it also had a simultaneous month-long release on the HBO Max streaming service. The film grossed $206million against a budget of $39million and received mixed reviews from critics, who praised the performances of Wilson and Farmiga, but criticized the screenplay and noted it to be weaker than the previous installments. A sequel, The Conjuring 4, is in development.

Plot
In 1981, demonologists Ed and Lorraine Warren document the exorcism of 8-year-old David Glatzel, attended by his family, his sister Debbie, her boyfriend Arne Johnson, and Father Gordon in Brookfield, Connecticut. During the exorcism, Arne invites the demon to enter his body instead of David's. Ed witnesses the demon transport itself from David's body to Arne's while he suffers from a heart attack and is taken to a hospital in an unconscious state.

The following month, Ed wakes up at the hospital and reveals to Lorraine that he witnessed the demon enter Arne's body. She sends the police to the Glatzel household, warning them that a tragedy will occur there. Arne and Debbie return to their apartment located above a kennel where Debbie works. After feeling unwell, Arne murders his landlord, Bruno Sauls, by stabbing him 22 times due to his demonic possession. With the support of the Warrens, his case becomes the first American murder trial to claim demonic possession as a defense, resulting in the beginning of an investigation into David's original possession. The Warrens later discover a satanic curse passed on through a witch's totem and meet with Kastner, a former priest who previously dealt with the Disciples of the Ram cult. He tells them that an occultist had intentionally left the totem, resulting in the creation of a curse on the Glatzels, causing the possession of David.

The Warrens travel to Danvers, Massachusetts, to investigate the death of Katie Lincoln, who was also stabbed 22 times. Detectives had found a totem at the home of Katie's friend Jessica, who is missing. Lorraine initiates a vision to recreate the murder and discovers that Jessica had stabbed Katie while possessed before jumping to her death off of a cliff, which allows detectives to recover her body. The Warrens travel to the funeral home where her body rests, and Lorraine touches the corpse's hand to help find the location of the occultist. Lorraine, in a vision, witnesses the occultist attempting to have Arne kill himself but stops her just in time. Lorraine is threatened by the occultist and she tells Ed that the connection works both ways.

The Warrens return to their house in Connecticut to investigate further. Drew reveals that he has found a book of Stregherian witchcraft which states that for the curse to be lifted, the altar used by the occultist must be destroyed. Ed is affected by the curse, a totem being discovered in a vase of flowers delivered to the house, but is stopped by Drew when attacking Lorraine. When they realize Katie attended nearby Fairfield University, they begin to assume the occultist is operating in the area. Lorraine returns to Kastner for help, and he reveals that he had secretly raised a daughter, Isla, in violation of the requirement of clerical celibacy in the Catholic Church. As he researched the occult, Isla grew fascinated in it, later becoming the occultist. Kastner tells Lorraine that Isla's altar must be in the tunnels underneath the house, leading her into them before Isla finds and kills him. Ed soon arrives and finds his way into the tunnels through a locked drain hole with a sledgehammer. He is briefly bewitched by Isla and attempts to kill Lorraine, but she forces him to recall the time they first met, reminding him of their love. Ed regains his senses and destroys the altar, saving himself, Lorraine and Arne. Isla arrives at her broken altar, only to be killed by the demon she had summoned after failing to complete the curse.

Ed places the cup from the altar in the artifact room, along with the Valak painting and the Annabelle doll. Arne is convicted of manslaughter but ends up serving a sentence of only five years, marrying Debbie while in prison. Ed shows Lorraine a gazebo like the one in which they first kissed.

Cast

Production

Development 
In 2016, regarding further potential sequels, James Wan stated, "There could be many more [Conjuring] movies because the Warrens have so many stories." Screenwriters Chad and Carey W. Hayes also expressed interest in working on a story for another sequel. However, Wan stated that he may be unable to direct the film due to his commitments to other projects. He told Collider, "Assuming we are lucky enough to have a third chapter, there are other filmmakers that I would love to sort of continue on the Conjuring world, if we are lucky enough". Wan also noted that, if a third film were to be made, it would ideally take place in the 1980s. Wan later stated that the sequel could include lycanthropy, "Maybe we can go and do it like a classic American Werewolf in London style. [...] The Warrens set against the backdrop of The Hound of Baskerville". In May 2017, Safran said it would be unlikely that a third installment would be a "haunted house" film.

In June 2017, it was announced a third installment was in development, with The Conjuring 2 co-writer David Leslie Johnson-McGoldrick hired to write the screenplay. In August 2017, Wan told Entertainment Weekly that the filmmakers have "been working hard on The Conjuring 3", and that "we're in the midst of working on the script, and still hashing [it] out. We want to make sure that the script is in a really good place. With how much people have loved the first two [Conjuring films], I don't want to rush in to the third one if possible." By September of the following year, producer Peter Safran stated that the script was near completion and that production would begin sometime during 2019. In May 2019, it was revealed that James Wan co-wrote the story with David Leslie Johnson-McGoldrick.

Pre-production 

In October 2018, it was announced that The Conjuring 3 would not be directed by Wan, but instead would be directed by The Curse of La Llorona director Michael Chaves. Wan stated that he was impressed while working with him on The Curse of La Llorona. In December 2018, Wan confirmed the film's plot details. Wan spoke with Bloody Disgusting, saying, "I think it's the first time in America's history where the defendant used possessions as a reason, as an excuse." In October 2019, Joseph Bishara—who composed the scores for The Conjuring, Annabelle, The Conjuring 2, The Curse of La Llorona and Annabelle Comes Home—was confirmed to be returning to score this third Conjuring film. In December 2019, the film's official title, The Conjuring: The Devil Made Me Do It, was revealed.

Casting 
In December 2018, it was confirmed that Patrick Wilson and Vera Farmiga would reprise their roles as Ed and Lorraine Warren respectively from The Conjuring and The Conjuring 2. In August 2019, actress Megan Ashley Brown announced that she and Mitchell Hoog would portray young Lorraine and Ed Warren respectively. In December 2019, Sterling Jerins, Julian Hilliard, Sarah Catherine Hook and Ruairi O'Connor were all confirmed as part of the film's cast by director Chaves.

Filming 
Filming began on June 3, 2019, in Atlanta, Georgia. On August 15, 2019, Farmiga announced that she had finished filming her scenes. Additional photography was initially scheduled for April 2020, but was delayed due to the COVID-19 pandemic. During reshoots, Chaves opted to remove a demonic antagonist, played by Davis Osbourne. The character was supposed to be working with The Occultist, but Chaves believed it "just wasn't quite connecting", and instead gave Osbourne a role as an infirmary patient. John Noble's role was also expanded upon during reshoots.

Release

Theatrical and streaming
The Conjuring: The Devil Made Me Do It was released in the United Kingdom on May 26, 2021, and in the United States on June 4, 2021, distributed by Warner Bros. Pictures and New Line Cinema. In the United States, as part of its plans for all of its 2021 films, Warner Bros. will also stream The Conjuring: The Devil Made Me Do It simultaneously on the HBO Max service for a period of one month, after which the film will be removed from the service until the normal home media release schedule period. It was delayed due to the COVID-19 pandemic's effect on theaters and the film industry, after previously being scheduled to be released on September 11, 2020. The film was re-added to HBO Max on October 21, 2021.

Home media 
The Conjuring: The Devil Made Me Do It was released on Digital HD on July 23, 2021, and was released on DVD, Blu-ray, and Ultra HD Blu-ray by Warner Bros. Home Entertainment on August 24, 2021, under the title The Conjuring 3: The Devil Made Me Do It.

Reception

Streaming viewership 

Following its opening weekend, Samba TV reported the film was streamed in 1.6million American households over its first three days of release. It was watched in 3million households over the first 17 days. The film was watched in over 3million U.S. households by the end of its first 30 days of release.

Box office
The Conjuring: The Devil Made Me Do It grossed $65.6million in the United States and Canada, and $140.8million in other territories, for a worldwide total of $206.4million.

In the United States, the film was released alongside Spirit Untamed, and was projected to gross $15–20million from 3,100 theaters in its opening weekend. The film made $9.8million on its first day, increasing estimates to $25–27million. It ended up debuting to $24million, the second-lowest of The Conjuring Universe franchise but still marking the third-best opening of the pandemic and topped the box office. The film fell 57% to $10.3million in its sophomore weekend, finishing third, then $5.2million in its third weekend.

Critical response
On review aggregator Rotten Tomatoes, 55% of 249 critic reviews for the film are positive, with an average rating of 5.8/10. The website's critics consensus reads: "The Devil Made Me Do It represents a comedown for the core Conjuring films, although Vera Farmiga and Patrick Wilson keep the audience invested." On Metacritic, the film has a weighted average score of 53 out of 100 based on 39 critics, indicating "mixed or average reviews". Audiences polled by CinemaScore gave the film an average grade of "B+" on an A+ to F scale (down from the "A−" grade of the first two films), while PostTrak reported 78% of audience members gave it a positive score, with 58% saying they would definitely recommend it.

Carlos Aguilar of the TheWrap wrote: "The Devil Made Me Do It opens with a disturbing sequence, set in 1981, that stands as the scariest part of the supernatural saga to date. That's not to say that the nearly two hours that ensue are devoid of tension and well-paced jump scares, but the sheer chaos and malevolence on display right out of the gate are unmatched elsewhere." In his review for Variety, Owen Gleiberman praised the performances of Wilson and Farmiga but wrote: "The new film lacks that kinetic haunted-house element. It's the most somber and meditative and least aggressive of the Conjuring films." From The Hollywood Reporter, David Rooney said: "This one offers plenty of lurid fun and some genuine scares. But the grounding in dark spirituality that made the previous entries focused on the Warrens so compelling gets diluted, despite the reliably dignifying double-act of Vera Farmiga and Patrick Wilson."

Lena Wilson of The New York Times gave the film a positive review, stating that "'The Devil Made Me Do It' is an excellently spooky work of fiction. It would be even better if it privileged ghoulishness over gospel." Hanna Flint of Empire wrote "The Conjuring: The Devil Made Me Do It hits some major horror notes, with Wilson and Farmiga providing much needed heart and soul, but the new Satanic worship elements causes the franchise to take a farcical turn."

Joshua Rivera of Polygon said that "This setup makes this installment of The Conjuring feel like a supernatural detective film ... It's a pretty good idea, and a decent change of pace for the series. But The Devil Made Me Do It struggles to reach the highs of the previous movies under this new structure." Tom Jorgensen of IGN rated the film a 6 out of 10, concluding that "Though The Devil Made Me Do It is a smart recalibration for The Conjuring series, its successes have little to do with its strengths as a standalone horror movie" and that "The Conjuring: The Devil Made Me Do It is greater than the sum of its parts and functions best in how it opens the series up to new kinds of stories to tell in the future."

Sequel 
In October 2022, the Hollywood Reporter revealed that a fourth Conjuring film was in development. It will be written by David Leslie Johnson-McGoldrick and produced by James Wan and Peter Safran.

See also 
Exorcism in Christianity

References

External links 
 
 
 

2020s ghost films
2020s supernatural horror films
2021 horror thriller films
American ghost films
American horror thriller films
American sequel films
American supernatural horror films
Conjuring 3
Conjuring 3
Demons in film
Films about exorcism
Films about Satanism
Films about spirit possession
Films about witchcraft
Films postponed due to the COVID-19 pandemic
Films produced by James Wan
Films produced by Peter Safran
Films scored by Joseph Bishara
Films set in 1981
Films set in Connecticut
Films set in Massachusetts
Films shot in Atlanta
Films with screenplays by David Leslie Johnson-McGoldrick
HBO Max films
Horror films based on actual events
Legal horror films
New Line Cinema films
Religious horror films
Warner Bros. films
2020s English-language films
Films directed by Michael Chaves